Palmer v Western Australia was a case heard by the High Court of Australia during the COVID-19 pandemic, which held that the Quarantine (Closing the Border) Directions and the authorising legislation, the Emergency Management Act 2005, were not impermissibly infringing section 92 of the Constitution of Australia.

Background 

On 15 March 2020, the Minister for Emergency Services declared a State of Emergency in Western Australia, due to the COVID-19 pandemic. The following day, a Public Health State of Emergency was declared by the Minister for Health. Following the declarations, the Quarantine (Closing the Border) Directions ('Directions') were given by the Commissioner of Police and State Emergency Coordinator, closing the Western Australian border to all non-essential travellers from 5 April 2020. These directions were continually extended until the Western Australian border reopened on 3 March 2022.

In mid-May of 2020, Clive Palmer was refused entry into Western Australia, under the Directions. On 25 May 2020, Palmer commenced proceedings against Western Australia in the High Court, on the basis that the Directions and the authorising legislation impermissibly infringed section 92 of the Constitution. Section 92 concerns "trade, commerce, and intercourse among the States", which shall be "absolutely free".

Decision 

The High Court's decision was handed down on 6 November 2020, with its reasons published on 24 February 2021. The court found that the sections of the authorising legislation for the Directions—sections 55 and 67 of the Emergency Management Act 2005—did not impermissibly infringe s 92 of the Constitution in "their application to an emergency constituted by the occurrence of a hazard in the nature of a plague or epidemic". The judgment went on to state that "the exercise of power given by those provisions to make paras 4 and 5 of the Quarantine (Closing the Border) Directions (WA) does not raise a constitutional question", and that costs were to be paid by the plaintiffs.

Consequences 
As a result of the unsuccessful challenge to the hard border, the Directions and the hard border remained in effect. Border control measures were eased from November 14, with some travellers from "very low risk" jurisdictions permitted to enter Western Australia without an exemption.

Due to comments made by Mark McGowan and Palmer towards each other over the border challenge, each sued the other, with $5000 and $20,000 awarded to Palmer and McGowan respectively.

See also 

 Mineralogy v Western Australia – High Court case brought by Palmer against WA over a mining compensation claim

References

External links 
 Case B26/2020 : Palmer & Anor v. The State of Western Australia & Anor

High Court of Australia cases
COVID-19 pandemic in Australia
2020 in Australian law